Matthew 14:22 is a verse in the fourteenth chapter of the Gospel of Matthew in the New Testament.

Content
In the original Greek according to Westcott-Hort for this verse is:
Καὶ εὐθέως ἠνάγκασεν ὁ Ἰησοῦς τοὺς μαθητὰς αὐτοῦ ἐμβῆναι εἰς τὸ πλοῖον, καὶ προάγειν αὐτὸν εἰς τὸ πέραν, ἕως οὗ ἀπολύσῃ τοὺς ὄχλους.  

In the King James Version of the Bible the text reads:
And straightway Jesus constrained his disciples to get into a ship, and to go before him unto the other side, while he sent the multitudes away.

The New International Version translates the passage as:
Immediately Jesus made the disciples get into the boat and go on ahead of him to the other side, while he dismissed the crowd.

Analysis
It is thought that Jesus was concerned that "the people would come and make Him king." (John 6:15), so He had to constrain the disciples to leave Him, even though they wanted very much to stay with Jesus. Other possible motives of Christ are that 1) He wanted to be alone to pray and 2) it gave an opportunity for the next miracle of calming the sea.

Commentary from the Church Fathers
Chrysostom: "Desiring to occasion a diligent examination of the things that had been done, He commanded those who had beheld the foregoing sign to be separated from Him; for even if He had continued present it would have been said that He had wrought the miracle fantastically, and not in verity; but it would never be urged against Him that He had done it in His absence; and therefore it is said, And straightway Jesus compelled his disciples to get into a ship, and to go before him to the other side, while he sent the multitudes away."

Jerome: "These words show that they left the Lord unwillingly, not desiring through their love for their teacher to be separated from Him even for a moment."

References

External links
Other translations of Matthew 14:22 at BibleHub

14:22